Antonio Abertondo (August 1, 1918 – July 6, 1978) of Argentina was the first person to complete a two way swim of the English Channel. He completed the swim on 21 September 1961 in a time of 43 hours 10 minutes with just a 4-minute rest in France. He also swam the English Channel on three other occasions, in 1950, 1951 and 1954.

References

1918 births
1978 deaths
Argentine male swimmers
Male long-distance swimmers
English Channel swimmers